The Cavalier of the Streets is a 1937 British comedy film directed by Harold French and starring Margaret Vyner, Patrick Barr and Carl Harbord. It was filmed at Pinewood Studios. An aristocratic lady is blackmailed.

Plot
In this courtroom drama, barrister Sir John Avalon's (James Craven) wife Fay (Margaret Vyner) is accused of murdering her husband. Will her husband's partner, the Cavalier (Patrick Barr), who is blackmailing her, confess to killing him in time to save her life?

Cast
 Patrick Barr as The Cavalier
 Margaret Vyner as Fay Avalon
 Carl Harbord as Prince Karanov
 James Craven as Sir John Avalon
 Peggy Chester as Daphne Brook
 Laura Smithson as Mrs Rudd
 Renee De Vaux as Lady Carnal
 Leo Genn as Attorney General

Critical reception
TV Guide wrote, "More boring courtroom drama; English directors of the 1930s never seemed to tire of this stuff. Genn's brief appearance is the only enlivening factor here."

References

External links

1937 films
1937 comedy films
1930s English-language films
British comedy films
Films shot at Pinewood Studios
Films directed by Harold French
British black-and-white films
British and Dominions Studios films
1930s British films